DeLauné Michel is an American author and actress. She was raised in southern Louisiana in a literary family which includes her uncle, Andre Dubus; her mother, Elizabeth Nell Dubus; and her cousins, mystery writer James Lee Burke, Andre Dubus III (House of Sand and Fog), and Alafair Burke.

The Baton Rouge, Louisiana-born Michel was named for Helene DeLauné, according to family history the first woman over from France on her mother's side of the family. Helene DeLauné was in the court of Marie Antoinette and her husband, Jules André Dubus, fought in the French Revolution. Antoinette gave Helene jewels to help her and her husband escape to Louisiana. Michel's father's family was the eleventh family in New Orleans.

Upon leaving high school (St. Joseph's Academy in Baton Rouge), Michel moved to New York City. She did some modeling there and in Europe, then spent several years studying acting in NYC with teachers from the Neighborhood Playhouse, the Actors Studio, Juilliard, and the Yale Drama School.

After moving to Los Angeles, Michel had guest starring roles on TV shows such as NYPD Blue, The Gilmore Girls, and Judging Amy, among others. She did a number of independent films that never saw the light of day and Equity-waiver theatre, including her own one-woman show.

In 1996, Michel created "Spoken Interludes", a critically acclaimed reading series where award-winning, bestselling, and up-coming writers read their own work. This literary institution has been covered extensively by publications ranging from the Los Angeles Times, The New York Times, GQ Magazine, LA Magazine, LA Weekly, and has been heard on NPR.

Works
The first two short stories that Michel wrote won recognition in the Thomas Wolfe Prize Short Fiction Competition sponsored by Duke University. Later work won the Pacificus Foundation Literary Award. One of her short stories caught the eye of an agent, who then sent it to Joyce Carol Oates, who referred to Michel's writing as "a wonderful, idiosyncratic voice and an extremely promising talent." But Ms. Oates felt that the story was actually a chapter of a novel. Michel agreed and her first novel, Aftermath of Dreaming, was born.

In Aftermath of Dreaming (William Morrow/HarperCollins, April 2006), Michel explores the universal themes of abandonment, forgiveness, and letting go. The novel is loosely based on an intimate six-year relationship she shared with Warren Beatty. Her second novel The Safety of Secrets was published by Avon A/HarperCollins in May 2008. She lives in Westchester County, New York with her husband and two sons.

References

External links
Spoken Interludes
DeLaune Michel

Actresses from Baton Rouge, Louisiana
American stage actresses
American film actresses
American television actresses
American women short story writers
21st-century American novelists
American women novelists
Living people
Year of birth missing (living people)
21st-century American women writers
21st-century American short story writers